Auchmacoy railway station was a railway station in Crawhead, Aberdeenshire, near the Burn of Auchmacoy from which the station took its name. It was located on the Boddam branch line between Ellon and Boddam.

History
Opened by the Great North of Scotland Railway, then joining the London and North Eastern Railway during the Grouping of 1923. It was then closed by that company.

References

Notes

Sources 
 
 
 
 Auchmacoy railway station on navigable OS map

External links
 RAILSCOT on Boddam Branch

Disused railway stations in Aberdeenshire
Railway stations in Great Britain opened in 1897
Railway stations in Great Britain closed in 1932
Former Great North of Scotland Railway stations
1897 establishments in Scotland
1932 disestablishments in Scotland